In human biology, handedness is an individual's preferential use of one hand, known as the dominant hand, due to it being stronger, faster or more dextrous. The other hand, comparatively often the weaker, less dextrous or simply less subjectively preferred, is called the non-dominant hand. In a study from 1975 on 7688 children in US grades 1-6, Left handers comprised 9.6% of the sample, with 10.5% of male children and 8.7% of female children being left-handed. Handedness is often defined by one's writing hand, as it is fairly common for people to prefer to do a particular task with a particular hand. There are examples of true ambidexterity (equal preference of either hand), but it is rare—most people prefer using one hand for most purposes.

Most of the current research suggests that left-handedness has an epigenetic marker—a combination of genetics, biology and the environment.

Because the vast majority of the population is right-handed, many devices are designed for use by right-handed people, making their use by left-handed people more difficult. In many countries, left-handed people are or were required to write with their right hands. Left-handed people are also more prone to certain health problems. However, left-handed people have an advantage in sports that involves aiming at a target in an area of an opponent's control, as their opponents are more accustomed to the right-handed majority. As a result, they are over-represented in baseball, tennis, fencing, cricket, boxing, and mixed martial arts (MMA).

Types 

 Right-handedness is the most common type. Right-handed people are more skillful with their right hands. Studies suggest that approximately 90% of people are right-handed.
 Left-handedness is less common. Studies suggest that approximately 10% of people are left-handed.
 Ambidexterity refers to having equal ability in both hands. Those who learn it still tend to favor their originally dominant hand. This is uncommon, with about a 1% prevalence.
 Mixed-handedness or cross-dominance is the change of hand preference between different tasks. This is very uncommon in the population with less than 1% prevalence. This cannot be learned and is highly associated with the person's childhood brain development.

Measurement 
Handedness may be measured behaviourally (performance measures) or through questionnaires (preference measures). The Edinburgh Handedness Inventory has been used since 1971 but contains many dated questions and is hard to score. The longer Waterloo Handedness Questionnaire is not widely accessible. More recently, the Flinders Handedness Survey (FLANDERS) has been developed.

Causes 
There are several theories of how handedness develops.

Language dominance 
One common handedness theory is the brain hemisphere division of labor. In most people, the left side of the brain controls speaking. The theory suggests it is more efficient for the brain to divide major tasks between the hemispheres—thus most people may use the non-speaking (right) hemisphere for perception and gross motor skills. As speech is a very complex motor control task, the specialised fine motor areas controlling speech are most efficiently used to also control fine motor movement in the dominant hand. As the right hand is controlled by the left hemisphere (and the left hand is controlled by the right hemisphere) most people are, therefore right-handed. The theory depends on left-handed people having a reversed organisation. However, the majority of left-handers have been found to have left-hemisphere language dominance—just like right-handers. Only around 30% of left-handers are not left-hemisphere dominant for language. Some of those have reversed brain organisation, where the verbal processing takes place in the right-hemisphere and visuospatial processing is dominant to the left hemisphere. Others have more ambiguous bilateral organisation, where both hemispheres do parts of typically lateralised functions. When tasks investigating lateralisation are averaged across a group of left-handers, the overall effect is that left-handers show the same pattern of data as right-handers, but with a reduced asymmetry. This finding is likely due to the small proportion of left-handers who have atypical brain organisation.

Genetic factors 
Handedness displays a complex inheritance pattern. For example, if both parents of a child are left-handed, there is a 26% chance of that child being left-handed. A large study of twins from 25,732 families by Medland et al. (2006) indicates that the heritability of handedness is roughly 24%.

Two theoretical single-gene models have been proposed to explain the patterns of inheritance of handedness, by Marian Annett of the University of Leicester, and by Chris McManus of UCL.

However, growing evidence from linkage and genome-wide association studies suggests that genetic variance in handedness cannot be explained by a single genetic locus. From these studies, McManus et al. now conclude that handedness is polygenic and estimate that at least 40 loci contribute to the trait.

Brandler et al. performed a genome-wide association study for a measure of relative hand skill and found that genes involved in the determination of left-right asymmetry in the body play a key role in handedness. Brandler and Paracchini suggest the same mechanisms that determine left-right asymmetry in the body (e.g. nodal signaling and ciliogenesis) also play a role in the development of brain asymmetry 
(handedness being a reflection of brain asymmetry for motor function).

In 2019, Wiberg et al. performed a genome-wide association study and found that handedness was significantly associated with four loci, three of them in genes encoding proteins involved in brain development.

Epigenetic factors 

Twin studies indicate that genetic factors explain 25% of the variance in handedness, and environmental factors the remaining 75%. While the molecular basis of handedness epigenetics is largely unclear, Ocklenburg et al. (2017) found that asymmetric methylation of CpG sites plays a key role for gene expression asymmetries related to handedness.

Prenatal hormone exposure 
Four studies have indicated that individuals who have had in-utero exposure to diethylstilbestrol (a synthetic estrogen based medication used between 1940 and 1971) were more likely to be left-handed over the clinical control group. Diethylstilbestrol animal studies "suggest that estrogen affects the developing brain, including the part that governs sexual behavior and right and left dominance".

Prenatal vestibular asymmetry 
Previc, after reviewing a large number of studies, found evidence that the position of the fetus in the final trimester and a baby's subsequent birth position can affect handedness. About two-thirds of fetuses present with their left occiput (back of the head) at birth. This partly explains why prematurity results in a decrease in right-handedness. Previc argues that asymmetric prenatal positioning creates asymmetric stimulation of the vestibular system, which is involved in the development of handedness. In fact, every major disorder in which patients show reduced right-handedness is associated with either vestibular abnormalities or delay, and asymmetry of the vestibular cortex is strongly correlated with the direction of handedness.

Ultrasound 
Another theory is that ultrasound may sometimes affect the brains of unborn children, causing higher rates of left-handedness in children whose mothers receive ultrasound during pregnancy. Research suggests there may be a weak association between ultrasound screening (sonography used to check the healthy development of the fetus and mother) and left-handedness.

Developmental timeline  
Researchers studied fetuses in utero and determined that handedness in the womb was a very accurate predictor of handedness after birth. In a 2013 study, 39% of infants (6 to 14 months) and 97% of toddlers (18 to 24 months) demonstrated a hand preference.

Infants have been observed to fluctuate heavily when choosing a hand to lead in grasping and object manipulation tasks, especially in one- versus two-handed grasping. Between 36 and 48 months, there is a significant decline in variability between handedness in one-handed grasping; it can be seen earlier in two-handed manipulation. Children of 18–36 months showed more hand preference when performing bi-manipulation tasks than with simple grasping.

The decrease in handedness variability in children of 36–48 months may be attributable to preschool or kindergarten attendance due to increased single-hand activities such as writing and coloring. Scharoun and Bryden noted that right-handed preference increases with age up to the teenage years.

Recently, studies have shown that left-handers and right-handers differ in their growth trajectory, i.e., among kindergarten children left-handers have longer digit length whereas among adults left -handers have shorter digit lengths.

Correlation with other factors

Intelligence 

In his book Right-Hand, Left-Hand, Chris McManus of University College London argues that the proportion of left-handers is increasing, and that an above-average quota of high achievers have been left-handed. He says that left-handers' brains are structured in a way that increases their range of abilities, and that the genes that determine left-handedness also govern development of the brain's language centers.

Writing in Scientific American, he states:
Studies in the U.K., U.S. and Australia have revealed that left-handed people differ from right-handers by only one IQ point, which is not noteworthy ... Left-handers' brains are structured differently from right-handers' in ways that can allow them to process language, spatial relations and emotions in more diverse and potentially creative ways. Also, a slightly larger number of left-handers than right-handers are especially gifted in music and math. A study of musicians in professional orchestras found a significantly greater proportion of talented left-handers, even among those who played instruments that seem designed for right-handers, such as violins. Similarly, studies of adolescents who took tests to assess mathematical giftedness found many more left-handers in the population.

Conversely, it was found that evidence for left-handers was overrepresented amongst those with higher cognitive skills, such as Mensa members and higher-performing takers of SAT and MCAT tests, due to methodological and sampling issues in studies. He also found that left-handers were overrepresented among those with lower cognitive skills and mental impairments, with those with intellectual disability (ID) being roughly twice as likely to be left-handed, as well as generally lower cognitive and non-cognitive abilities amongst left-handed children. In a systematic review and meta-analysis, Ntolka and Papadatou-Pastou found that right-handers had higher IQ scores, but that difference was negligible (about 1.5 points).

The prevalence of difficulties in left-right discrimination was investigated in a cohort of 2,720 adult members of Mensa and Intertel by Storfer. According to the study, 7.2% of the men and 18.8% of the women evaluated their left-right directional sense as poor or below average; moreover participants who were relatively ambidextrous experienced problems more frequently than did those who were more strongly left- or right-handed. The study also revealed an effect of age, with younger participants reporting more problems.

Early childhood intelligence 
Nelson, Campbell, and Michel studied infants and whether developing handedness during infancy correlated with language abilities in toddlers. In the article they assessed 38 infants and followed them through to 12 months and then again once they became toddlers from 18 to 24 months. They discovered that when a child developed a consistent use of their right or left hand during infancy (such as using the right hand to put the pacifier back in, or grasping random objects with the left hand), they were more likely to have superior language skills as a toddler. Children who became lateral later than infancy (i.e., when they were toddlers) showed normal development of language and had typical language scores. The researchers used Bayley scales of infant and toddler development to assess all the subjects.

Music
In two studies, Diana Deutsch found that left-handers, particularly those with mixed hand preference, performed significantly better than right-handers in musical memory tasks. There are also handedness differences in perception of musical patterns. Left-handers as a group differ from right-handers, and are more heterogeneous than right-handers, in perception of certain stereo illusions, such as the octave illusion, the scale illusion, and the glissando illusion.

Health
Studies have found a positive correlation between left-handedness and several specific physical and mental disorders and health problems. For example:

Lower-birth-weight and complications at birth are positively correlated with left-handedness.

A variety of neuropsychiatric and developmental disorders like autism spectrum disorders, depression, bipolar disorder, anxiety disorders, schizophrenia, and alcoholism have been associated with left- and mixed-handedness.

A 2012 study showed that nearly 40% of children with cerebral palsy were left-handed, while another study demonstrated that left-handedness was associated with a 62% increased risk of Parkinson's disease in women, but not in men. Another study suggests that the risk of developing multiple sclerosis increases for left-handed women, but the effect is unknown for men at this point.

Left-handed women may have a higher risk of breast cancer than right-handed women and the effect is greater in post-menopausal women.

At least one study maintains that left-handers are more likely to suffer from heart disease, and are more likely to have reduced longevity from cardiovascular causes.

Left-handers may be more likely to suffer bone fractures.
 
Converted Left-Hander or Knot in the Brain is a condition experienced by someone who is doing everything, or many things, with the subordinate right side of their body. This causes an array of symptoms to develop. These include: distress, reading and concentration difficulties, poor physical co-ordination and clumsiness, memory blackouts, knots in the brain and inferiority complex. On diagnosis by an expert and advice given, the patient starts to use the dominant left side of their body to do everything and starts to recover. 

One systematic review concluded: "Left-handers showed no systematic tendency to suffer from disorders of the immune system".
 
As handedness is a highly heritable trait associated with various medical conditions, and because many of these conditions could have presented a Darwinian fitness challenge in ancestral populations, this indicates left-handedness may have previously been rarer than it currently is, due to natural selection. However, on average, left-handers have been found to have an advantage in fighting and competitive, interactive sports, which could have increased their reproductive success in ancestral populations.

Income 
In a 2006 U.S. study, researchers from Lafayette College and Johns Hopkins University concluded that there was no statistically significant correlation between handedness and earnings for the general population, but among college-educated people, left-handers earned 10 to 15% more than their right-handed counterparts.

However, more recently, in a 2014 study published by the National Bureau of Economic Research, Harvard economist Joshua Goodman finds that left-handed people earn 10 to 12 percent less over the course of their lives than right-handed people. Goodman attributes this disparity to higher rates of emotional and behavioral problems in left-handed people.

Left-handedness and sports 

Interactive sports such as table tennis, badminton and cricket have an overrepresentation of left-handedness, while non-interactive sports such as swimming show no overrepresentation. Smaller physical distance between participants increases the overrepresentation. In fencing, about half the participants are left-handed. The term southpaw is sometimes used to refer to a left-handed individual, especially in baseball and boxing. Some studies suggest that right handed male athletes tend to be statistically taller and heavier than left handed ones.

Other, sports-specific factors may increase or decrease the advantage left-handers usually hold in one-on-one situations:
 In cricket, the overall advantage of a bowler's left-handedness exceeds that resulting from experience alone: even disregarding the experience factor (i.e., even for a batsman whose experience against left-handed bowlers equals his experience against right-handed bowlers), a left-handed bowler challenges the average (i.e., right-handed) batsman more than a right-handed bowler does, because the angle of a bowler's delivery to an opposite-handed batsman is much more penetrating than that of a bowler to a same-handed batsman (see Wasim Akram).
 In baseball, a right-handed pitcher's curve ball will break away from a right-handed batter and towards a left-handed batter. While studies of handedness show that only 10% of the general population is left-handed, the proportion of left-handed MLB players is closer to 39% of hitters and 28% of pitchers, according to 2012 data. Historical batting averages show that left-handed batters have a slight advantage over right-handed batters when facing right-handed pitchers. Because there are fewer left-handed pitchers than right-handed pitchers, left-handed batters have more opportunities to face right-handed pitchers than their right-handed counterparts have against left-handed pitchers. Fourteen of the top twenty career batting averages in Major League Baseball history have been posted by left-handed batters. Left-handed batters have a slightly shorter run from the batter's box to first base than right-handers. This gives left-handers a slight advantage in beating throws to first base on infield ground balls. Perhaps more importantly, the follow through of a left-handed swing provides momentum in the direction of first base, while the right handed batter must overcome the swing momentum towards third base before beginning his run.
 Because a left-handed pitcher faces first base when he is in position to throw to the batter, whereas a right-handed pitcher has his back to first base, a left-handed pitcher has an advantage when attempting to pick off baserunners at first base.
 Defensively in baseball, left-handedness is considered an advantage for first basemen because they are better suited to fielding balls hit in the gap between first and second base, and because they do not have to pivot their body around before throwing the ball to another infielder. For the same reason, the other infielder's positions are seen as being advantageous to right-handed throwers. Historically, there have been few left-handed catchers because of the perceived disadvantage a left-handed catcher would have in making the throw to third base, especially with a right-handed hitter at the plate. A left-handed catcher would have a potentially more dangerous time tagging out a baserunner trying to score. With the ball in the glove on the right hand, a left-handed catcher would have to turn his body to the left to tag a runner. In doing so, he can lose the opportunity to brace himself for an impending collision. On the other hand, the Encyclopedia of Baseball Catchers states:

 In four wall handball, typical strategy is to play along the left wall forcing the opponent to use their left hand to counter the attack and playing into the strength of a left-handed competitor.
 In handball, left-handed players have an advantage on the right side of the field when attacking, getting a better angle, and that defenders might be unused to them. Since few people are left-handed, there is a demand for such players.
 In water polo, the centre forward position has an advantage in turning to shoot on net when rotating the reverse direction as expected by the centre of the opposition defence and gain an improved position to score. Left-handed drivers are usually on the right side of the field, because they can get better angles to pass the ball or shoot for goal.
 Ice hockey typically uses a strategy in which a defence pairing includes one left-handed and one right-handed defender. A disproportionately large number of ice hockey players of all positions, 62 percent, shoot left, though this does not necessarily indicate left-handedness.
 In American football, the handedness of a quarterback affects blocking patterns on the offensive line. Tight ends, when only one is used, typically line up on the same side as the throwing hand of the quarterback, while the offensive tackle on the opposite hand, which protects the quarterback's "blind side," is typically the most valued member of the offensive line. Receivers also have to adapt to the opposite spin. While uncommon, there have been several notable left-handed quarterbacks.
 In bowling, the oil pattern used on the bowling lane breaks down faster the more times a ball is rolled down the lane. Bowlers must continually adjust their shots to compensate for the ball's change in rotation as the game or series is played and the oil is altered from its original pattern. A left-handed bowler competes on the opposite side of the lane from the right-handed bowler and therefore deals with less breakdown of the original oil placement. This means left-handed bowlers have to adjust their shot less frequently than right-handed bowlers in team events or qualifying rounds where there are possibly 4-10 people per set of two lanes. This can allow them to stay more consistent. However, this advantage is not present in bracket rounds and tournament finals where matches are 1v1 on a pair of lanes.

Sex 
According to a meta-analysis of 144 studies, totaling 1,787,629 participants, the best estimate for the male to female odds ratio was 1.23, indicating that men are 23% more likely to be left-handed. For example, if the incidence of female left-handedness was 10%, then the incidence of male left-handedness would be approximately 12% (10% incidence of left-handedness among women multiplied by an odds ratio of 1:1.23 for women:men results in a 12.3% incidence of left-handedness among men).

Sexuality and gender identity 

Some studies examining the relationship between handedness and sexual orientation have reported that a disproportionate minority of homosexual people exhibit left-handedness, though findings are mixed.

A 2001 study also found that males whose gender identity did not align with their sex assigned at birth, were more than twice as likely to be left-handed than a clinical control group (19.5% vs. 8.3%, respectively).

Paraphilias (atypical sexual interests) have also been linked to higher rates of left-handedness. A 2008 study analyzing the sexual fantasies of 200 males found "elevated paraphilic interests were correlated with elevated non-right handedness". Greater rates of left-handedness have also been documented among pedophiles.

A 2014 study attempting to analyze the biological markers of asexuality asserts that non-sexual men and women were 2.4 and 2.5 times, respectively, more likely to be left-handed than their heterosexual counterparts.

Mortality rates in combat 
A study at Durham University—which examined mortality data for cricketers whose handedness was a matter of public record—found that left-handed men were almost twice as likely to die in war as their right-handed contemporaries. The study theorised that this was because weapons and other equipment was designed for the right-handed. “I can sympathise with all those left-handed cricketers who have gone to an early grave trying desperately to shoot straight with a right-handed Lee Enfield .303,” wrote a journalist reviewing the study in the cricket press. The findings echo those of previous American studies, which found that left-handed US sailors were 34% more likely to have a serious accident than their right-handed counterparts.

Episodic memory
A high level of handedness (whether strongly favoring right or left) is associated with poorer episodic memory, and with poorer communication between brain hemispheres, which may give poorer emotional processing, although bilateral stimulation may reduce such effects.

Corpus callosum 
A high level of handedness is associated with a smaller corpus callosum whereas low handedness with a larger one.

In culture 

Many tools and procedures are designed to facilitate use by right-handed people, often without realizing the difficulties incurred by the left-handed. John W. Santrock has written, "For centuries, left-handers have suffered unfair discrimination in a world designed for right-handers."

As a child, British king George VI (1895–1952) was naturally left-handed. He was forced to write with his right hand, as was common practice at the time. He was not expected to become king, so that was not a factor. McManus noted that, as the Industrial Revolution spread across Western Europe and the United States in the 19th century, workers needed to operate complex machines that were designed with right-handers in mind. This would have made left-handers more visible and at the same time appear less capable and more clumsy. During this era, children were taught to write with a dip pen. While a right-hander could smoothly drag the pen across paper from left to right, a dip pen could not easily be pushed across by the left hand without digging into the paper and making blots and stains.

Negative connotations and discrimination

Moreover, apart from inconvenience, left-handed people have historically been considered unlucky or even malicious for their difference by the right-handed majority. In many languages, including English, the word for the direction "right" also means "correct" or "proper". Throughout history, being left-handed was considered negative, or evil; even into the 20th century, left-handed children were beaten by schoolteachers for writing with their left hand.

The Latin adjective sinister means "left" as well as "unlucky", and this double meaning survives in European derivatives of Latin, including the English words "sinister" (meaning both 'evil' and 'on the bearer's left on a coat of arms') and "ambisinister" meaning 'awkward or clumsy with both or either hand'.

There are many negative connotations associated with the phrase "left-handed": clumsy, awkward, unlucky, insincere, sinister, malicious, and so on. A "left-handed compliment" is one that has two meanings, one of which is unflattering to the recipient. In French, gauche means both "left" and "awkward" or "clumsy", while droit(e) (cognate to English direct and related to "adroit") means both "right" and "straight", as well as "law" and the legal sense of "right". The name "Dexter" derives from the Latin for "right", as does the word "dexterity" meaning manual skill. As these are all very old words, they would tend to support theories indicating that the predominance of right-handedness is an extremely old phenomenon.

Black magic is sometimes referred to as the "left-hand path".

Until very recently in Taiwan (and still in Mainland China, Japan and both North and South Korea), left-handed people were forced to switch to being right-handed, or at least switch to writing with the right hand. Due to the importance of stroke order, developed for the comfortable use of right-handed people, it is considered more difficult to write legible Chinese characters with the left hand than it is to write Latin letters, though difficulty is subjective and depends on the writer. Because writing when moving one's hand away from its side towards the other side of the body can cause smudging if the outward side of the hand is allowed to drag across the writing, writing in the Latin alphabet might possibly be less feasible with the left hand than the right under certain circumstances. Conversely, right-to-left alphabets, such as the Arabic and Hebrew, are generally considered easier to write with the left hand in general. Depending on the position and inclination of the writing paper, and the writing method, the left-handed writer can write as neatly and efficiently or as messily and slowly as right-handed writers. Usually the left-handed child needs to be taught how to write correctly with the left hand, since discovering a comfortable left-handed writing method on one's own may not be straightforward.

In the Soviet Union, all left-handed children were forced to write with their right hand in the Soviet school system.

International Left-Handers Day 

International Left-Handers Day is held annually every August 13. It was founded by the Left-Handers Club in 1992, with the club itself having been founded in 1990. International Left-Handers Day is, according to the club, "an annual event when left-handers everywhere can celebrate their sinistrality (left-handedness) and increase public awareness of the advantages and disadvantages of being left-handed." It celebrates their uniqueness and differences, who are from seven to ten percent of the world's population. Thousands of left-handed people in today's society have to adapt to use right-handed tools and objects. Again according to the club, "in the U.K. alone there were over 20 regional events to mark the day in 2001 – including left-v-right sports matches, a left-handed tea party, pubs using left-handed corkscrews where patrons drank and played pub games with the left hand only, and nationwide 'Lefty Zones' where left-handers' creativity, adaptability and sporting prowess were celebrated, whilst right-handers were encouraged to try out everyday left-handed objects to see just how awkward it can feel using the wrong equipment."

In other animals 
Kangaroos and other macropod marsupials show a left-hand preference for everyday tasks in the wild. 'True' handedness is unexpected in marsupials however, because unlike placental mammals, they lack a corpus callosum. Left-handedness was particularly apparent in the red kangaroo (Macropus rufus) and the eastern gray kangaroo (Macropus giganteus). Red-necked (Bennett's) wallabies (Macropus rufogriseus) preferentially use their left hand for behaviours that involve fine manipulation, but the right for behaviours that require more physical strength. There was less evidence for handedness in arboreal species. Studies of dogs, horses, and domestic cats have shown that females of those species tend to be right-handed, while males tend to be left-handed.

See also

General
 Cardinal direction
 Clockwise, which also discusses counterclockwise/anticlockwise, the two terms for the opposite sense of rotation
 Dexter and sinister
 Footedness
 Laterality
 List of left-handed presidents of the United States
 Left- and right-hand traffic
 Ocular dominance (eyedness)
 Proper right and proper left
 Relative direction

Handedness
 Edinburgh Handedness Inventory
 Geschwind–Galaburda hypothesis
 Neuroanatomy of handedness
 Situs inversus
 Twins and handedness

References

External links 

 Lefties Have The Advantage In Adversarial Situations, ScienceDaily, April 14, 2006.
 Science Creative Quarterly's overview of some of the genetic underpinnings of left-handedness
 A left-handed senior citizen recalls the emotional torment he faced at a New York public school in the 1920s. (Audio slideshow)
 Woznicki, Katrina (2005). "Breast Cancer Risk Doubles for Southpaw Women", MedPage Today, 26 September.
 Hansard (1998). "Left-handed Children", Debate contribution by the Rt Hon. Mr. Peter Luff (MP for Mid-Worcestershire), House of Commons, 22 July.
 
 Handedness and Earnings / Higher paychecks: a left-handed compliment?
 Handedness & earnings, published in Journal of Human Resources 2007
 Handedness Research Institute
 Study Reveals Why Lefties Are Rare

 
Chirality
Discrimination
Mental processes
Asymmetry

ca:Dretà